Clement Ashiteye known as Clemento Suarez, is a Ghanaian comedian and actor.

Early life
His tertiary education was at the School of Performing Arts at the University of Ghana in Legon where he graduated in 2010.

Career
After studying the industry, Clemento Suarez started his profession career in 2011 by doing unpaid work. He later decided to become a professional comedian. Clemento has worked with creative directors such as Latif Abubakar, and has featured in the Ghanaian TV series Kejetia vs Makola. He co-hosted the third edition of the 3Music Awards with O. B. Amponsah which was the first virtual award concert organized in Ghana during lock-down period because of COVID-19. He was named together with Gladys Owiredu by organisers of the Ghana Outstanding Women Awards (GOWA) as hosts of this year's (2021) Ghana Outstanding Women Awards (GOWA) awards ceremony.

Filmography
 Gallery of Comedy
 Thank for Idiots
 Romantic Nonsense
 Sweet Dreams & Nightmares
 What Can Come Can Come
 Flagstaff House
 Mallams & Pastors
 I Can't Think Far
 Dinner For Promotion
 Blue Back
 Prison Graduates
 Ama 2G
 Ladder
 Keteke
 You Play Me
 I Play You
 Bukom
 Upstairs & Downstairs
 The Inspection
 Master and 3 Maids
 Yellow Café and Wofa Kay
 Royal Diadem
 Kejetia vs Makola
 3 idiots and a wiseman
 Accra We Dey

Awards

Personal life 
Clemento Suarez married his long-time girlfriend Sylvia Bioh on 24th October, 2020.

External links

References

Ghanaian comedians
Living people
Ghanaian male film actors
Year of birth missing (living people)